is a passenger railway station on the Minato Line in the city of Hitachinaka, Ibaraki, Japan, operated by the third-sector railway operator Hitachinaka Seaside Railway. It opened on 1 October 2014, the first new station to open on the line in 52 years.

Lines

Station layout
The station consists of a single side platform, and is unstaffed.

History
The name of the new station was formally unveiled on 15 December 2013. It opened on 1 October 2014.

Surrounding area
The station takes its name from a steel bridge (tekkyō in Japanese) across the Nakamaru River, and translates as the "Railway Bridge in Takada".

See also
 List of railway stations in Japan

References

External links

 

Railway stations in Ibaraki Prefecture
Railway stations in Japan opened in 2014
Hitachinaka, Ibaraki